The Ministry of Culture of the Slovak Republic is a government ministry of Slovakia. Its headquarters are in Bratislava.

References

External links

Ministry of Culture
Ministry of Culture 
Ministry of Culture (old website)
Ministry of Culture (old website) 
Music Centre Slovakia, a project of the ministry
Music Centre Slovakia 

Government of Slovakia
Slovakia